Aymen Bacha (born 26 October 1999) is a Tunisian weightlifter. He represented Tunisia at the 2019 African Games held in Rabat, Morocco, and he won the silver medal in the men's 109kg event.

In 2018, at the Mediterranean Games held in Tarragona, Catalonia, Spain, he won the silver medal in the 105kg Snatch event. He won the bronze medal in his event at the 2019 African Weightlifting Championships held in Cairo, Egypt.

In 2020, he finished in 6th place in the men's 109kg event at the Roma 2020 World Cup in Rome, Italy.

He represented Tunisia at the 2020 Summer Olympics in Tokyo, Japan. He competed in the men's 109 kg event.

He won two medals at the 2022 Mediterranean Games held in Oran, Algeria. He won the silver medal in the men's 102 kg Snatch event and the gold medal in the men's 102 kg Clean & Jerk event.

References

External links 
 

Living people
1999 births
Place of birth missing (living people)
Tunisian male weightlifters
African Games medalists in weightlifting
African Games silver medalists for Tunisia
Competitors at the 2019 African Games
Mediterranean Games medalists in weightlifting
Mediterranean Games gold medalists for Tunisia
Mediterranean Games silver medalists for Tunisia
Competitors at the 2018 Mediterranean Games
Competitors at the 2022 Mediterranean Games
Weightlifters at the 2020 Summer Olympics
Olympic weightlifters of Tunisia
African Weightlifting Championships medalists
21st-century Tunisian people